Grand Arc is a mountain of Savoie, France. It lies in the Massif de la Vanoise range. It has an elevation of 2,484 metres above sea level.

References

Mountains of the Alps
Mountains of Savoie